The Ford Everest is a mid-size SUV produced by Ford Motor Company since 2003. Developed and destined mainly for the Asia-Pacific region with production centered in Thailand, the first-generation Everest is based on the Mazda-based Ford Ranger pickup truck, while the following generations is based on the globally-marketed T6 Ranger. Unlike the Ranger which was paralleled with the Mazda B series or BT-50 until 2020, the Everest has no Mazda equivalent, as it was seen as unfitting for the brand. As of 2023, the Everest is the only right-hand-drive SUV that seats up to more than five.

It is known as the Ford Endeavour in the Indian market to avoid legal issues due to the existence of a spice-making brand with the same name in the country.



First generation (U268; 2003) 

Ford unveiled the first-generation Everest in March 2003 at the 24th Bangkok International Motor Show. Designed especially for Asian markets, the Everest shares 60 percent of the Ranger's components, including its 2.5-liter intercooled turbo-diesel engine and the exterior styling from the front to the B-pillars. It was revealed that the development of the car took four years and costs US$100 million including investments needed to manufacture the Everest.

As it is based on the Ranger, it retained the double wishbone independent front suspension and leaf spring rear suspension from the Ranger, while also engineered into making the level of ride comfort and handling of a standard that is better than the Ranger.

The Everest was sold in Southeast Asia, India, Middle East, Central America, the Bahamas and several African countries. It was built at the AutoAlliance Thailand plant in Rayong, and as CKD kits in Chengalpattu, India and Hai Duong, Vietnam. In India, the vehicle was introduced as the Endeavour in 2003.

Facelift 
In November 2006, the Everest underwent a major facelift that saw the whole front and side body panels replaced to match the redesign of its base vehicle, the Ranger. Changes also included an updated front fascia, new transmission and an improved engine. In addition, the redesign featured the new 5-speed automatic transmission with BorgWarner transfer case, and an Active-Shift-on-the-Fly function (4x4 only) for the first time. Despite the massive changes, it retained most mechanical parts along with its U268 project code. However, the 2007–2015 model is sometimes referred to as the second-generation Everest by Ford or journalists.

A second facelift was introduced in 2009. While the changes were less prominent than the previous facelift, Everest now sports a rounder fascia than its predecessor and was similar with the facelifted Ranger. The changes were achieved by changing the front fender assembly, front hood, front headlights, front grill and front bumper, while it also featured larger 18-inch polished alloy wheels, a redesigned tailgate and new tail lamps.

Another smaller update was introduced in 2012, now sporting a revised front grille. In 2013, the Everest received a final facelift, featuring a redesigned front bumper in line with some other global Ford cars.

Second generation (U375/UA; 2015) 

The second-generation Everest was unveiled as a near-production concept vehicle in March 2014 and as a production version November 2014 ahead of its public debut at the Guangzhou International Motor Show. Based on the T6 Ranger, the car is now developed by Ford Australia. In China, the Ford Everest is manufactured by the JMC-Ford joint venture, at JMC's Nanchang factory.

It features a complete redesign which featured rounder proportions for a more modern appearance. Dimension-wise, the 2015 Ford Everest is shorter in length but wider and taller, altering its proportions compared to its predecessor.

The second-generation Everest is used as a basis for a light-duty tactical vehicle for the French military, called the Arquus Trapper VT4.

Production and sales of the Endeavour in India ended in 2021 due to the closure of all Ford manufacturing plants in the country. Attempts to continue its production in the country through a contractual basis had fallen through.

Facelift 
This model received a facelift in May 2018, coinciding with the Ranger facelift. The facelift included design tweaks, equipment list update, new 2.0-litre bi-turbo diesel engine and 10-speed automatic gearbox. Other changes include Autonomous Emergency Braking, a standard kick-activated power liftgate, and new alloy wheels. Interior changes include more soft touch materials such as ebony dark colour scheme. Another facelift was released for the 2021 year model in November 2020 in Thailand.

Arquus Trapper VT4

Third generation (U704; 2022) 

The third-generation Everest was revealed on 1 March 2022. The four-wheel-drive model will be available with the option of 3.0-litre turbodiesel V6 and  towing capacity.

Sales

References

External links 

 

Everest
Cars introduced in 2003
Mid-size sport utility vehicles
2010s cars
2020s cars
Rear-wheel-drive vehicles
All-wheel-drive vehicles